Jondab or Jandab may refer to:

Jondab, Qom
Jandab, Razavi Khorasan